Interstate 759 (I-759) is a part of the Interstate Highway System in the US state of Alabama. It begins at I-59 in Attalla and ends at U.S. Route 411 (US 411) in southern Gadsden adjacent to the Gadsden Mall. The route continues east as the at-grade thoroughfare State Route 759 (SR 759) until the route ends at SR 291 in Gadsden.

Route description

I-759 begins at exit 182 of I-59 in Attalla. From this point, the route travels in an easterly direction across a marshy area prior to reaching its first exit at Black Creek Parkway, a diamond interchange. From the Black Creek exit, I-759 continues in its easterly direction and crosses the Coosa River along a causeway and short bridge prior to reaching US 411. At the US 411 interchange, the I-759 designation ends, but the route continues as SR 759 in spanning the Coosa River.

History

A new four-lane bridge crossing the Coosa River opened in 2004.

Future
Currently, there are plans to extend I-759 east to US 278 on the east side of Gadsden. In May 2022, the Alabama Department of Transportation announced that it would fund the $65 million eastern extension. There have also been plans to extend the route west from Interstate 59 to U.S. Route 411 in Attalla.

Exit list

References

External links

 Interstate 759 Alabama @ Interstate-Guide.com
 Alabama @ SouthEastRoads.com - Interstate 759

59-7
59-7
759
Transportation in Etowah County, Alabama
7